Brian Leslie Dunsby, OBE is a British entrepreneur. 

He is the principal of Perlex Associates, Harrogate, North Yorkshire. He is the chief executive of the non-profit Yorkshire Business Market LTD. He founded a perlite business which he sold to a major agricultural supplier.  Afterwards he channelled much of his energies thorough Perlex Associates, which outsourced organisational tasks. He has helped other entrepreneurs to create and grow new businesses.

Business career 
In 1992 Dunsby became Chief Executive of the Institute of Business Advisers.

Dunsby was elected director of the International Council of Small Business in 1999, organising the 2003 World Conference. 

In 2001 he was elected director of the UK Institute for Small Business and Entrepreneurship. He was also organising the International Entrepreneurship Conferences from 2004-2008.

During the 2001-2006 period he was on the governing body of the World Association of SMEs. Dunsby has been the Chief Executive of the Harrogate Chamber of Commerce from 2006 to 2016. 

Dunsby organised the Harrogate Christmas Market in 2013, an award winning event put on by Perlex Associates and Harrogate Chamber of Commerce, under the auspices of the non-profit Yorkshire Business Market Ltd.

Dunsby was the secretary of the John Innes Manufactures Association (JIMA), until he retired form that role after 32 years involvement with the organization in 2010.

Awards and nominations 
In 2008, he was awarded the Queen's Award for Enterprise Promotion. 

He was appointed OBE in the 2017 Birthday Honours.

References

Officers of the Order of the British Empire
Queen's Award for Enterprise Promotion (2008)
British businesspeople
Living people
Year of birth missing (living people)